The 2017 Meath Senior Football Championship is the 125th edition of the Meath GAA's premier club Gaelic football tournament for senior clubs in County Meath, Ireland. Eighteen teams compete, with the winner representing Meath in the Leinster Senior Club Football Championship. The championship starts with a group stage and then progresses to a knock out stage.

Simonstown Gaels were the defending champions after they defeated Donaghmore/Ashbourne in the 2016 final, and they successfully defended their title to claim their 2nd ever crown when defeating Summerhill in the final in Pairc Tailteann by 2–9 to 0–7 on 29 October 2017. Padraig McKeever raised the Keegan Cup for the North Navan side and also claimed the "Man-of-the-Match" award for the second year in succession.

This was St. Colmcille's return to the top flight after a 20-year exodus since relegation in 1996, due to claiming the 2016 Meath Intermediate Football Championship title as well as a Leinster IFC title and an All-Ireland IFC runners-up spot.

This year saw the 10th "Navan El Classico" take place in the SFC as Simonstown Gaels defeated Navan O'Mahonys in the group stage by 0–12 to 0–7. Their current overall head-to-head score is 5–4 in favour of O'Mahonys and 1 draw. 
 
The draw for the group stages of the championship were made on 6 March 2017 with the games commencing on the weekend of 20 May 2017.

Duleek/Bellewstown were relegated to the I.F.C. for the first time in since being established in 2008 after failing to win a match all season, and thus ended their 10-season tenure in the top flight.

The semi-final between Simonstown Gaels and Wolfe Tones was the first Meath championship match to be broadcast live by Eir Sport, which the second semi-final between Summerhill and Gaeil Colmcille was the first senior match to be broadcast live on the newly developed Meath GAA App.

Team Changes
The following teams have changed division since the 2016 championship season.

To S.F.C.
Promoted from I.F.C.
 St. Colmcille's  -  (Intermediate Champions)

From S.F.C.
Relegated to I.F.C.
 Ballinlough

Participating Teams
The teams taking part in the 2017 Meath Senior Football Championship are:

Group stage
There are three groups of six teams called Group A, B and C. The 2 top finishers in each group and the third-place finisher in Group A will qualify for the quarter finals. The third placed teams in Group B and C will qualify for a Preliminary Quarter Final, with the winner earning a place in last eight. The bottom finishers of each group will qualify for the Relegation Play Off.
The draw for the group stages of the championship were made on 6 March 2017 with the games commencing on the weekend of 20 May 2017.

Group A

Round 1
 Donaghmore/Ashbourne 2-13, 1-13 Rathkenny, Pairc Tailteann, 18/5/2017,
 Gaeil Colmcille 1-11, 0-11 Wolfe Tones, Athboy, 18/5/2017,
 Summerhill 1-13, 2-5 Duleek/Bellewstown, Pairc Tailteann, 21/5/2017,

Round 2
 Rathkenny 0-13, 1-6 Duleek/Bellewstown, Simonstown, 21/7/2017,
 Wolfe Tones 2–12, 1-15 Donaghmore/Ashbourne, Pairc Tailteann, 23/7/2017,
 Summerhill 1-12, 0-11 Gaeil Colmcille, Trim, 23/7/2017,

Round 3
 Wolfe Tones 2-14, 1-9 Rathkenny, Pairc Tailteann, 13/8/2017,
 Gaeil Colmcille 1-17, 1-8 Duleek/Bellewstown, Walterstown, 13/8/2017,
 Summerhill 2-15, 2-7 Donaghmore/Ashbourne, Pairc Tailteann, 15/8/2017,

Round 4
 Wolfe Tones 2-20, 0-10 Duleek/Bellewstown, Castletown, 25/8/2017,
 Summerhill 1-18, 0-9 Rathkenny, Simonstown, 25/8/2017,
 Gaeil Colmcille 2-9, 0-12 Donaghmore/Ashbourne, Pairc Tailteann, 26/8/2017,

Round 5
 Donaghmore/Ashbourne 7-16, 0-7 Duleek/Bellewstown, Donore, 8/9/2017,
 Wolfe Tones 2-11, 0-11  Summerhill, Simonstown, 8/9/2017,
 Gaeil Colmcille 0-15, 0-8 Rathkenny, Meath Hill, 8/9/2017,

Group B

Round 1
 Navan O'Mahonys 1-13, 1-10 Blackhall Gaels, Dunshaughlin, 19/5/2017,
 Moynalvey 0-17, 1-9 Seneschalstown, Trim, 19/5/2017,
 Simonstown Gaels 1-16, 2-12 St. Colmcille's, Pairc Tailteann, 19/5/2017,

Round 2
 Simonstown Gaels 2-17, 0-11 Moynalvey, Pairc Tailteann, 20/7/2017,
 Seneschalstown 3-16, 2-12 Blackhall Gaels, Dunshaughlin, 24/7/2017,
 Navan O'Mahonys 0-12, 0-9 St. Colmcille's, Pairc Tailteann, 25/7/2017,

Round 3
 Simonstown Gaels 3-13, 1-10 Seneschalstown, Castletown, 12/8/2017,
 St. Colmcille's 1–15, 1-15 Blackhall Gaels, Ratoath, 13/8/2017,
 Moynalvey 3-15, 1-15 Navan O'Mahonys, Skryne, 13/8/2017,

Round 4
 Simonstown Gaels 0-12, 0-7 Navan O'Mahonys, Pairc Tailteann, 27/8/2017,
 Seneschalstown 1-14, 1-13 St. Colmcille's, Stamullen, 27/8/2017,
 Moynalvey 3-14, 1-10 Blackhall Gaels, Summerhill, 27/8/2017,

Round 5
 Navan O'Mahonys 3-14, 0-9 Seneschalstown, Pairc Tailteann, 9/9/2018,
 Moynalvey 3-14, 2-13 St. Colmcille's, Skryne, 9/9/2018,
 Simonstown Gaels 1-12, 1-4 Blackhall Gaels, Dunshaughlin, 9/9/2018,

Group C

Round 1
 St. Peter's Dunboyne 1-12, 1-7 Dunshaughlin, Dunsany, 17/5/2017,
 St. Patrick's 2-16, 1-10 Skryne, Duleek, 19/5/2017,
 Ratoath 1-14, 0-14 Na Fianna, Dunsany, 19/5/2017,

Round 2
 Ratoath 1-16, 1-7 St. Patrick's, Skryne, 21/7/2017,
 Dunshaughlin 1–11, 1-11 Na Fianna, Summerhill, 23/7/2017,
 St. Peter's Dunboyne 2-14, 0-10 Skryne, Ratoath, 24/7/2017,

Round 3
 St. Peter's Dunboyne 2-16, 2-12 St. Patrick's, Duleek, 13/8/2017,
 Na Fianna 0–14, 0-14 Skryne, Pairc Tailteann, 14/8/2017,
 Ratoath 2-10, 0-8 Dunshaughlin, Ashbourne, 14/8/2017,

Round 4
 Ratoath 1-14, 0-11 Skryne, Ashbourne, 27/8/2017,
 St. Peter's Dunboyne 2-23, 1-15 Na Fianna, Dunshaughlin, 27/8/2017,
 St. Patrick's 1-10, 0-12 Dunshaughlin, Ashbourne, 28/8/2017,

Round 5
 Na Fianna 1-11, 1-7 St. Patrick's, Walterstown, 10/9/2018,
 Dunshaughlin 2-14, 1-11 Skryne, Trim, 10/9/2018,
 Ratoath 2-13, 1-11 St. Peter's Dunboyne, Pairc Tailteann, 10/9/2018,

Knock-Out Stage

The winners and runners up of the three groups and the third placed team of Group A automatically qualify for the quarter finals. The third placed teams in Groups B and C play off to determine the team that completes the quarter final lineup.

{{16TeamBracket-Compact-NoSeeds-Byes
| RD1=Preliminary round
| RD2=Quarter-Finals
| RD3=Semi-Finals
| RD4=Final
|group1=
|group2=
| score-width= 35

| RD1-team01= Navan O'Mahonys
| RD1-score01= 1-20 (A.E.T.)
| RD1-team02= Na Fianna
| RD1-score02= 1-13 (A.E.T.)

| RD2-team01= Summerhill
| RD2-score01= 2-12
| RD2-team02= Navan O'Mahonys
| RD2-score02= 1-10
| RD2-team03= Moynalvey
| RD2-score03= 0-13
| RD2-team04= Gaeil Colmcille
| RD2-score04= 1-11
| RD2-team05= Simonstown Gaels
| RD2-score05= 4-12
| RD2-team06= St. Peter's Dunboyne 
| RD2-score06= 2-16
| RD2-team07= Ratoath
| RD2-score07= 0-14 (A.E.T.)
| RD2-team08= Wolfe Tones
| RD2-score08= 0-15 (A.E.T.)

| RD3-team01= Summerhill| RD3-score01= 1-15| RD3-team02= Gaeil Colmcille
| RD3-score02= 0-9
| RD3-team03= Simonstown Gaels| RD3-score03= 4-9| RD3-team04= Wolfe Tones
| RD3-score04= 1-13

| RD4-team01= Summerhill
| RD4-score01=0-7 
| RD4-team02= Simonstown Gaels| RD4-score02= 2-9 
}}

Preliminary Quarter-Final

Quarter-finals

Semi-finals

Final

Relegation Play-Off Group
The three bottom teams from each group enter the relegation play-off group and play each other in a round robin basis.

The team with the worst record after two matches will be relegated to the 2018 Intermediate Championship.

Duleek/Bellewstown lost both round robin matches and were relegated meaning the final match between Skryne and Blackhall Gaels was not required.

 Game 1: Blackhall Gaels 1-13, 2-6 Duleek/Bellewstown, Skryne, 16/9/2017,
 Game 2: Skryne 2-19, 0-13 Duleek/Bellewstown, Dunshaughlin, 24/9/2017,

Leinster Senior Club Football ChampionshipQuarter Final: Starlights 0–8, 1-12 Simonstown, Wexford Park, 12/11/2017,Semi Final: St. Loman's Mullingar 0-13''', 1-8 Simonstown Gaels, Cusack Park, 26/11/2017,

References

External links

Meath Senior Football Championship
Meath Senior Football Championship